Phephna Junction railway station is a railway station in Phephna, Ballia, Uttar Pradesh. Its code is PEP. Phephna station falls under Varanasi railway division of North Eastern Railway zone of Indian Railways

Overview 
This station is located on the single-track,  broad gauge, Varanasi–Chhapra line. Doubling of railway line is sanctioned and work was in progress. Due to congestion in Ballia city, it has been decided to shift railway warehousing facility for offloading train rakes to Phephna Junction. It was reported in 2019 that development and construction was in progress and completion expected in two to three years. Phephna station is located about 10 km west of Ballia city

Electrification 
Phephna railway station is currently situated on single-track electrified line. There are two electrified tracks at the station. The electrification trial and inspection on Varanasi–Chhapra line was completed in December 2018.

Amenities 
Phephna Junction railway station has 2 booking windows and all basic amenities like drinking water, public toilets, sheltered area with adequate seating. There are two platforms at the station and one foot overbridge (FOB). Further two platforms and tracks are under development.

References

External links 

 Pictures of Phephna Junction railway station
 Construction of new platforms and tracks at Phephna Junction railway station

Railway stations in Ballia district
Varanasi railway division